The Speedo Tournament was a golf tournament held in Australia in 1955 and 1956. Total prize money was A£2,000. The sponsor was Speedo, an Australian swimwear manufacturer.

Winners

References

Golf tournaments in Australia
Recurring sporting events established in 1955
Recurring sporting events disestablished in 1956
1955 establishments in Australia
1956 disestablishments in Australia